The Transfiguration is a 2016 American horror drama film written and directed by Michael O'Shea. It was selected to be screened in the Un Certain Regard section at the 2016 Cannes Film Festival. The film was released in the United Kingdom on April 21, 2017.

Plot 
  
The film opens with a man in a public restroom who overhears slurping noises coming from the far stall. He sees that the stall has two people in and mistakenly believes that one man is performing fellatio on the other. He leaves in embarrassment. A look into the stall reveals that Milo, a 14-year-old boy who believes himself to be a vampire is actually drinking the blood of a dead man, having ambushed the man as he was using the bathroom. Milo then leaves for his home, public housing in Brooklyn, New York where he lives with his older brother, Lewis. Once home, he  adds his victim's stolen wallet to a secret bag of cash. He habitually watches movies about vampires and extreme graphic violence and writes in what appears to be a visual journal. The journal includes an ongoing list of rules that he believes vampires, must follow, like the time of day appropriate to hunt. The next morning, Milo throws up the blood. A neighborhood gang frequently torments Milo, at one point holding him down and urinating on him. As Milo takes a shower, burns on his back are visible. That night, while on a hunt, Milo becomes acquainted with another 14-year-old named Sophie who has just moved into the neighborhood.

The next day, he again encounters Sophie as a group of drunken teenage boys are gang raping her. Once they leave, Sophie begins cutting herself and Milo, seemingly in a trance, leans in towards Sophie's bloody arm before she stops him. Sophie admits to having contemplated suicide, and in response Milo cryptically tells her that he could not do so because it is "against the rules", alluding to the contents of his visual journal. Sophie finds him strange, yet endearing, and they return to Milo's house. When Milo shows Sophie a video of lambs being slaughtered, she abruptly leaves. The next day she explains she had seen similar videos and has bad memories associated with them. He visits the park where he sleeps beneath a bridge and ambushes a hobo and drinks his blood.

The next day he asks Sophie out for movies where they watch Nosferatu, which he considers a realistic depiction of vampirism. Sophie claims Twilight is a better film and suggests Milo watches it. She later gifts Milo a copy of the first Twilight novel. Milo speaks about what he thinks realistic vampires are like. He points out that he believes vampires cannot kill themselves. They talk about their family, revealing both parents of both of them are dead, specifically that Sophie's grandfather beats her and Milo's mother killed herself when he was younger. Milo confides in Sophie that he still doesn't know where her grave is located because his brother, Lewis, will not discuss it. Before the events of the film, his mother killed herself and Lewis walked in on Milo drinking the blood from her freshly slit wrists. Sophie tracks down Milo's mother's grave and she and Milo visit it.

Later, when a wealthy young white couple  ask Milo if he can help them acquire "C" or "molly", Milo leads the boyfriend to the basement of a nearby building. This location is revealed to be the meeting place of the gang that harasses Milo. Offended at the boyfriend's expectation of drugs, the gang kills him as Milo watches intensely through the window. Having grown worried, the man's girlfriend frantically confronts Milo about her boyfriend's whereabouts, but Milo ignores her. The police pick up Milo and inquire about a recent crime, telling Milo that if he does not tell the police what he knows about the crime, they will tell the neighborhood gang that he is a snitch.  The police then escort Milo back home. The gang, having seen this, grow distrustful of Milo.

Sitting at the Coney Island docks, Sophie and Milo discuss God, and what they would do with a million dollars. She tells him she would move in with her cousin in Alabama. The two consummate their relationship and live happily together in Milo's apartment for a few days until Sophie stumbles across Milo's hunting journal. Shaken, she leaves. Upon discovering Sophie's absence, Milo leaves her a voicemail asking for a chance to explain. In the mean time, Milo stalks a man to his home, exsanguinating him and his young daughter before stealing some fine china. On the way home, Milo weeps and contemplates jumping off of a tall building.

The next day,  Milo gives Andre, the leader of the gang, his collection of goods stolen from his victims, so they can "trust each other again". Milo then visits a police station and turns them in. In therapy, he explains to his therapist that he has recently been drawing a lot of pictures of the sun. He buys Sophie flowers and they leave for a day of fun at Coney Island. At night, sitting beneath the docks at the beach, he imagines killing her and sucking the blood out of her neck. Upon departure, he gives her the money she needs to move. She asks him to move with her but he refuses and leaves. At home, he watches a police shootout during which the entire gang is arrested.

The next morning, Lewis asks Milo if he heard that Andre's gang had been arrested. Milo feigns ignorance and asks Lewis, who used to be in the army, if he ever killed anyone. Lewis responds that while he had seen many body parts, he never killed anyone. Sensing that something is upsetting Milo, Lewis tells him that whatever he's feeling guilty about pales in comparison to all of the horrible things other people are doing to each other. Milo thanks him, and goes for a walk, where he is immediately gunned down by friends of the gang members he had arrested. Unaware that he has died, Sophie After unsuccessfully tries to contact Milo before boarding the bus to Alabama alone. As Milo is bagged and autopsied, Sophie reads a letter from Milo. In it, he reveals that he watched Twilight, but thought it "sucked", and that he has given vampire suicide some more thought. While he maintains that vampires cannot kill themselves directly, he alludes to his own actions and explains that he believes that a vampire could kill himself indirectly by orchestrating something that he knew would result in death, especially if motivated by a desire, but inability, to not hurt others. The last shot of the film is Milo's freshly buried casket.

Cast 
 Eric Ruffin as Milo
 Chloe Levine as Sophie
 Aaron Clifton Moten as Lewis
 Carter Redwood as Andre
 Danny Flaherty as Mike
 Larry Fessenden as Drunk Man
 Lloyd Kaufman as Hobo
 James Lorinz as Detective
 Victor Pagan as Deli Regular
 Anna Friedman as Stacey

Reception
On review aggregator Rotten Tomatoes, the film holds an approval rating of 85%, based on 55 reviews with an average rating of 6.6/10. The website's critical consensus reads, "The Transfiguration tells a quieter, more deliberately paced tale than genre fans might expect, but for those with the patience to let it sink in, it offers its own rewards." On Metacritic, the film has a weighted average rating of 65 out of 100, based on 16 reviews, indicating "generally favorable reviews".

References

External links 
 
 
 

2016 films
2016 horror films
2010s teen drama films
American teen horror films
American teen drama films
American vampire films
2016 directorial debut films
2016 drama films
2010s English-language films
2010s American films